Pioneer Square Labs (PSL) is an American startup studio and venture capital fund, founded in 2015 and is based in Seattle, Washington. PSL develops and tests new business ideas and creates new companies out of the successful ones. As of February 2021, Pioneer Square Labs was recognized as one of the top startup studios based on website traffic to its top 3 portfolio companies.

Spinouts
 LumaTax, a sales tax compliance tool for small business owners 
 Ad Lightning, an advertising analytics platform for publishers 
 JetClosing, a title insurance and escrow company 
 Boundless Immigration, a tool for helping people navigate the United States immigration system 
 Taunt, a company creating engaging experiences around live esports
 TraceMe, a fan engagement platform for athletes and celebrities 
Joon Care, a teletherapy practice providing mental health care for youth and young adults

References 

American companies established in 2015
Companies based in Seattle
Business incubators of the United States